Večje Brdo is a settlement in the Municipality of Dobje in eastern Slovenia. It lies on the road south of Dobje pri Planini towards Planina pri Sevnici. The area is part of the traditional region of Styria. It is now included with the rest of the municipality in the Savinja Statistical Region.

References

External links
Večje Brdo on Geopedia

Populated places in the Municipality of Dobje